Marine Turbine Technologies (MTT) is an American turbine manufacturer based in Franklin, LA. 
The company develops, designs and produces high performance turbines for primarily for marine applications, boats and fire-suppression pumps. 
It gained fame and became noted for developing and building what may be the most powerful and fastest street-legal motorcycle in the world, the turboshaft-powered MTT Y2K Turbine Superbike.

References

External links
 MTT homepage

Motorcycle manufacturers of the United States
Companies based in Louisiana